Due to the COVID-19 pandemic, a number of non-pharmaceutical interventions colloquially known as lockdowns (encompassing stay-at-home orders, curfews, quarantines,  and similar societal restrictions) have been implemented in numerous countries and territories around the world. These restrictions were established with the intention to reduce the spread of SARS-CoV-2, the virus that causes COVID-19. By April 2020, about half of the world's population was under some form of lockdown, with more than 3.9 billion people in more than 90 countries or territories having been asked or ordered to stay at home by their governments. Although similar disease control measures have been used for hundreds of years, the scale of those implemented in the 2020s is thought to be unprecedented.

Research and case studies have shown that lockdowns were generally effective at reducing the spread of COVID-19, therefore flattening the curve. The World Health Organization's recommendation on curfews and lockdowns is that they should be very brief, short-term measures to reorganize, regroup, rebalance resources, and protect health workers who are exhausted. To achieve a balance between restrictions and normal life, the WHO recommends a response to the pandemic that consists of strict personal hygiene, effective contact tracing, and isolating when ill.

Although many public health experts and economists supported lockdown restrictions, citing greater long-term costs for allowing the disease to spread uncontrollably, pandemic restrictions have had health, social, and economic impacts, and have been met with protests in some territories.

Efficacy

Several researchers, from modeling and demonstrated examples, have concluded that lockdowns are effective at reducing the spread of, and deaths caused by, COVID-19. Lockdowns are thought to be most effective at containing or preventing COVID-19 community transmission, healthcare costs and deaths when implemented earlier, with greater stringency, and when not lifted too early.

There is disagreement about the size of the effect of lockdowns on COVID-19 mortality. A systematic review with Johns Hopkins University by economists concluded that lockdowns as opposed to guidelines or medical advice had little to no effects on COVID-19 mortality. The authors attribute the differences in findings to an earlier review to its inclusion of modelling studies.

A study investigating the spread based on studies of the most common symptoms such as loss of taste and smell in France, Italy and the UK showed a marked decrease in new symptoms just a few days after the start of confinement on the countries (Italy and France) with the strongest lockdowns. Modelling on the United States pandemic suggested "the pandemic would have been almost completely suppressed from significantly taking off if the lockdown measures were implemented two weeks earlier" and that the second wave would have been less severe had the lockdown lasted another two weeks.

The stringent lockdown in Hubei in early 2020 proved effective at controlling the COVID-19 outbreak in China. The relatively high number of cases and deaths in Sweden, which has kept much of its society open during the pandemic, when compared to its neighbours with comparable demographics Norway, Denmark and Finland that did enforce lockdowns, is thought to be at least partly attributable to this difference in policy. Similarly, modelling on Australian data concluded that achieving zero community transmission through a strict lockdown lowers healthcare and economic costs compared to less stringent measures that allow transmission to continue, and warned that early relaxation of restrictions have greater costs. This "zero community transmission" approach was adopted in Australia, and a strict four month lockdown in the state of Victoria during an outbreak in Melbourne, combined with other measures, averted a wider outbreak in the country in 2020. New Zealand and Vietnam also adopted a "Zero-COVID" strategy throughout 2020 that included targeted lockdowns.

The emergence of the highly transmissible SARS-CoV-2 Delta variant in 2021 has led some commentators to suggest that although lockdowns continue to reduce the spread of COVID-19, they have become less effective at containing it. Lockdowns in Australia and Vietnam in response to Delta outbreaks proved less effective at containment than previous lockdowns were against the spread of other variants.

Voluntary versus mandatory restrictions 

One study led by an economist at the University of Chicago found that involuntary lockdowns had little impact, with voluntary distancing making up nearly 90% of the fall in consumer traffic as people feared the virus itself. Similarly, a National Bureau of Economic Research study found stay-at-home orders increased staying at home by just 5–10%. Another study from Yale University found that most social distancing was voluntary, driven primarily by "media coverage of morbidity and mortality."

On the other hand, some studies have argued that coercive measures probably decreased interactions, while accepting that most of the reduction may have been voluntary. One of those two studies, by Flaxman et al., has been criticized, among other things for having a country-specific adjustment factor, without which the model would predict a massive number of deaths for Sweden. One widely cited economic simulation asserting that shelter-in-place orders reduced total cases three-fold, however, held voluntary distancing constant. Another study found a 30% difference among border-counties where stay-at-home orders were imposed.

Another study that compared the impact of 'less restrictive interventions' on the spread of COVID-19 in Sweden and South Korea, with mandatory stay-at home orders in 8 other countries, such as France and Spain, did not find evidence for greater disease control in the countries with more restrictions. However, the findings of the study have been questioned due to its numerous limitations, including the small sample size of countries.

Some research has also found that an "advisory" approach is not adequate to control COVID-19 outbreaks. An analysis of an outbreak in northern Italy found that an effective reduction in community transmission occurred during a strict national lockdown, and that earlier less stringent measures were ineffective at reducing mobility to a level low enough to reduce the spread of COVID-19.

Since the beginning of the pandemic, Google has consistently collected data on movements, showing rapid declines in public activity long before legal restrictions were imposed. An April 2020 poll found that 93% of Americans voluntarily chose to only leave home when necessary, regardless of legal restrictions.

Reception 

A February 2021 review of 348 articles concluded there was acknowledgement of the importance of non-pharmaceutical interventions in controlling the spread of COVID-19. However, current research also acknowledges high societal costs, though less than the costs of allowing the pandemic to spread without mitigation.

Related to epidemiology 

Epidemiological evidence supports generalized non-pharmaceutical interventions to curb the spread of COVID-19.

During the early stages of the pandemic in Europe and the United States, statistical modeling which advised that restrictions were helpful to prevent a large number of deaths were used as the basis for lockdowns. This includes an Imperial College projection, led by epidemiologist Neil Ferguson. Despite some criticisms, academics defended the Imperial projection as fundamentally sound, while admitting the code was "a buggy mess." Retrospective evaluation of lockdowns and computer modeling has verified that they have significantly contributed to reducing mortality and morbidity from COVID-19.

A notable opponent of lockdowns has included Sweden's state epidemiologist Anders Tegnell, who has frequently criticised the strategy. The Swedish government's approach has included minimal restrictions and has been controversial in part due to the relatively high death toll due to widespread transmission. However, the Swedish government began considering enacting a lockdown in early 2021.

While arguing in August 2020 for the need for further lockdowns in the United States, physicians Ranu Dhillon and Abraar Karan argued for "smarter lockdowns" that impose restrictions on areas with high levels of transmission, and to increase support to vulnerable populations in these locations to offset the economic costs.

A number of medical experts signed the Great Barrington Declaration in October 2020 which called for "Focused Protection" on high risk groups and minimal restrictions on the general population to achieve herd immunity through COVID-19 infection. However, the majority of medical experts and the WHO have strongly criticised this proposed strategy for its lack of scientific basis and for being unethical. The declaration has also attracted controversy over its funding and the authenticity of its signatures.

Related to social impacts 

Some commentators have suggested that states' use of emergency powers to curb freedom of assembly and movement are authoritarian and may result in long-term democratic backsliding. Centralization of power by political leadership in Hungary, Poland, China and Cambodia in response to the COVID-19 pandemic have been cited as examples.

Some researchers have noted that COVID-19 pandemic restrictions have come with mental health costs, compounded by those caused by the COVID-19 pandemic itself.

Due to their closure, educational institutions worldwide transitioned to online learning. Teachers and faculty had to learn new ways to engage with students while in a COVID-19 pandemic. Examples of online teaching tools are podcasts, videos, and virtual classrooms.

UN Women warned in an April 2020 report that COVID-19 pandemic restrictions exacerbate gender inequalities and have led to an increase in domestic violence. Many women were being forced to 'lockdown' at home with their abusers at the same time that services to support survivors are being disrupted or made inaccessible. For instance, in France there was around a 30% spike in cases of since the lockdown in March 2020.

Related to economic impacts 

Some economists supported increased government funding for mitigation efforts, even at the cost of tolerating a very large economic contraction. They agreed that lockdowns should continue until the threat of resurgence has declined, even when considering only the economic impact. There was a general agreement, at least in some economic circles, that "severe lockdowns — including closing non-essential businesses and strict limitations on people's movement — are likely to be better for the economy in the medium term than less aggressive measures".
Both the World Food Programme (WFP) and the World Health Organization (WHO) have published statements noting the impact of the lockdowns on livelihoods and food security, and Dr David Nabarro, WHO Special Envoy on COVID-19 stated in October 2020 that "lockdowns just have one consequence that you must never ever belittle, and that is making poor people an awful lot poorer".

Protests 

There have also been a number of protests worldwide in opposition to lockdowns, including in the United Kingdom, the United States, Australia, Germany, the Netherlands, Canada and New Zealand. The motivations for and sizes of these protests have varied. Some have been spurred by the economic and social impacts of lockdowns, but have also been associated with misinformation related to the pandemic, conspiracy theories and anti-vaccination.

Table of pandemic lockdowns

In the table pandemic lockdowns are defined as the shutdown of parts of the economy, due to non-pharmaceutical anti-pandemic measures and are enforceable by law like:
 Closing of schools and kindergartens
 Closing of non-essential shops (shops and stores apart from food, doctors and drug stores)
 Closing of non-essential production
 Cancellation of recreational venues and closing of public places
 Curfews
 Stay-at-home orders and total movement control

These measures are considered to have caused the COVID-19 recession in 2020.
The table does not contain:
 Measures with smaller economic impacts like:
 border closures
 social distancing measures and social movement restrictions
 travel restrictions.
 Other non-pharmaceutical anti-pandemic measures like mandatory quarantines after travel, self quarantine and social distancing measures
 Any measures which are voluntary rather than enforceable by law

The pandemic has resulted in the largest number of shutdowns/lockdowns worldwide at the same time in history.
By 26 March, 1.7 billion people worldwide were under some form of lockdown, which increased to 3.9 billion people by the first week of April – more than half of the world's population.

Major restrictions first began in China, with other countries in East Asia like Vietnam soon following it in implementing widespread containment measures. Much of Europe, North America and Africa took much longer to bring in tough measures. Lockdowns between and within nations are of varying stringency.

By mid April, nearly 300 million people, or about 90 per cent of the population, were under some form of lockdown in the United States, with around 100 million in the Philippines and about 59 million in South Africa, while around 1.3 billion were under lockdown in India, which was the largest of all lockdowns.

By the end of April, around 300 million people were under lockdown in various countries of Europe, including but not limited to Italy, Spain, France, and the United Kingdom; while around 200 million people were under lockdown in Latin America.

Variation by countries and territories

See also

 Cordon sanitaire (medicine)
 COVID-19 community quarantines in the Philippines
 COVID-19 lockdown in China
 COVID-19 lockdown in India
 COVID-19 lockdown in Italy
 Flattening the curve
 List of species named after the COVID-19 pandemic (including lockdowns)
 Malaysian movement control order
 National responses to the COVID-19 pandemic
 Preventive action
 Stay-at-home order
 Timeline of the COVID-19 pandemic
 Support bubble

Notes

References 

Articles containing video clips
lockdowns
 
Curfews
Emergency management
Country lockdowns
Public health
Quarantine
Human rights abuses